Ilovița is a commune located in Mehedinți County, Oltenia, Romania. It is composed of three villages: Bahna, Ilovița and Moisești.

References

Communes in Mehedinți County
Localities in Oltenia